Don Digirolamo is an American retired re-recording mixer. He was nominated for three Academy Awards, winning once for his work on the film E.T. the Extra-Terrestrial (1982).

Awards and nominations

Academy Awards

British Academy Film Awards

Primetime Emmy Awards

Cinema Audio Society Awards

References

External links
 

Living people
American audio engineers
Re-recording mixers
Northeastern Illinois University alumni
Best Sound Mixing Academy Award winners
Primetime Emmy Award winners
Year of birth missing (living people)
Place of birth missing (living people)